Narraburra Shire was a local government area in the Riverina region of New South Wales, Australia.  It was established on 7 March 1906, incorporating the area around the town of Temora, but did not include Temora.

The grazier, cricketer and politician Geoffrey Keighley was President of Narraburra Shire from 1963 to 1967.

In 1981 Narraburra Shire was merged with the Municipality of Temora to form Temora Shire.

References

Further reading

Former local government areas of New South Wales
1906 establishments in Australia
1981 disestablishments in Australia